Operation Dudula is a vigilante organisation in South Africa, widely recognized as being xenophobic. The group has been linked with  violently threatening and targeting migrants. The group blames South Africa's porous borders, lenient immigration practices and the presence of migrants for many of South Africa's social issues.

Operation Dudula was established in Soweto, a township of Johannesburg but has since spread to other parts of the country. "Dudula" means to "force out" or "knock down" in isiZulu, and refers to the movement's goal to expel illegal migrants. Although they have been accused of violently targeting immigrants, Operation Dudula denies having any connection to xenophobic motives.

Operation Dudula states that its campaign is aimed at addressing crime, a lack of jobs and poor health services caused by an "influx of illegal immigrants". They have campaigned for small businesses to only employ South Africans, and for migrant shop keepers to close down and leave South Africa. Operation Dudula has been  accused of a number of instances of violence against African immigrants in South African townships, including forcibly closing shops and raiding properties. In July and August 2022, Operation Dudula targeted and confronted illegal migrants who occupied buildings in inner city Johannesburg. The group has no membership structure, is highly visible on social media and is composed of mainly affected community members.  

Other organisations associated with Operation Dudula include:

 South Africa First campaign
 Dudula Movement
 All Truck Drivers Foundation
 MKMVA – the UMkhonto we Sizwe Military Veterans' Association (disbanded).

Origins 
The group emerged from discourse that blamed migrants for the fallout and economic hardship of COVID-19 deaths and lockdowns. Operation Dudula led their first march on 16 June 2021 through Soweto targeting people they that they believed were foreign drug traffickers and businesses that they thought employed immigrants. The march increased their popularity and in the following months, several other anti-immigrant groups also going by Dudula or some variation of the name, such as the separate Alexandra Dudula Movement, were established. In April 2022, Operation Dudula expanded to Durban, KwaZulu Natal.

Operation Dulula was founded by Nhlanhla "Lux" Dlamini (also Mohlauhi). Dlamini rose to prominence for his role in defending Moponya Mall from looters in the July 2021 unrest. In March 2022, Dlamini was arrested (and later released on bail) on charges of orchestrating a raid of EFF member Victor Ramerafe's Dobsonville home where Operational Dudula claimed drugs were being sold. In July 2022, Dlamini left Operation Dudula.

Response 
Operation Dudula has been termed Afrophobic. Supporters of migrant rights argue that Operation Dudula is unjustly blaming migrants for economic hardship caused by South Africa's deep inequality.

Some opposition groups against Operation Dudula have been formed. Kopanang Africa against Xenophobia is a group established in opposition to Operation Dudula.

In April 2022, after civil society pressure, president Cyril Ramaphosa denounced Operation Dudula as illegal vigilantism. Although Operation Dudula is unaffiliated with a political party, its leaders have received public support from Patriotic Alliance leaders Gayton Mackenzie and Kenny Kunene.

See also 

 Xenophobia in South Africa

References 

Anti-immigration politics in Africa